YD, or Yd may refer to:

 Yard (yd), a unit of length
 Nissan YD engine, an automobile engine
 USS YD-43, later name for 
 Yarmouth–Dennis Red Sox, or Y-D Red Sox, a collegiate summer baseball team based in South Yarmouth, Massachusetts
 Younger Dryas, a geological period from c. 12,900 to c. 11,700 calendar years ago
 South Yemen (ISO 3166-1 code YD)
 YD-# Yard Derrick, a Crane vessel
 YD - Young Diem  / Early Day
 Yd. (retailer), an Australia and New Zealand clothing retail chain